Siagona jenissoni is a species of beetles in the family Carabidae.

Description
Body is flat with a constriction between the prothorax and mesothorax. Pronotum is densely punctured. Mandibles are short and strong. Males have quite longer trochanters than females. This species is brachypterous.

Biology
These carabids have a stenotopic lifestyle. They live in ground fissures and in darkness for most of their life. They are nocturnal hunters of ants.

Distribution
This species is present in southern Spain, in Portugal and on the coast of Morocco.

References

Beetles described in 1826
Siagoninae